Marcel Barnault (10 January 1901 – 6 August 1981) was a French actor, chiefly known for his starring role in The Battle of the Rails (1946).

Filmography 

 1932: F.P.1
 1933: The abbot Constantine
 1946: The Battle of the Rails
 1947: Rouletabille joue et gagne
 1948: Rouletabille contre la dame de pique

External links 
 https://www.imdb.com/name/nm0055435/

References 

1901 births
1981 deaths
Male actors from Paris